Portrait of Adele Bloch-Bauer II is a 1912 painting by Gustav Klimt. The work is a portrait of Adele Bloch-Bauer. Bloch-Bauer (1881–1925) was a Vienna socialite, who was a patron and close friend of Klimt. 

In 1907, Klimt completed an earlier portrait of Bloch-Bauer. During World War II, both portraits were among the artworks stolen by the Nazis from the descendants of Bloch-Bauer. After the war, Portrait of Adele Bloch-Bauer II was displayed at the Österreichische Galerie Belvedere until 2006, when it was returned to Adele Bloch-Bauer's niece.

Ownership
Adele Bloch-Bauer was the wife of Ferdinand Bloch-Bauer, a wealthy industrialist who sponsored the arts and supported Gustav Klimt. Adele Bloch-Bauer was the only person whose portrait was painted twice by Klimt; she also appeared in the much more famous Portrait of Adele Bloch-Bauer I. Adele's portraits had hung in the family home prior to their seizure by the Nazis during World War II. The Austrian museum where they resided after the war was reluctant to return them to their rightful owners, hence a protracted court battle in the United States and in Austria (see Republic of Austria v. Altmann) ensued, which resulted in the two Adele Bloch-Bauer portraits and three other Gustav Klimt paintings being returned to Maria Altmann, the niece of Ferdinand Bloch-Bauer, in January 2006.

In November 2006, Christie's auction house sold Portrait of Adele Bloch-Bauer II at auction for almost $88 million, the fourth-highest priced piece of art at auction at the time. The buyer was Oprah Winfrey.

In the fall of 2014, Adele Bloch-Bauer II was given as a special long-term loan to the Museum of Modern Art in New York City. During the summer of 2016, Oprah Winfrey sold it to an unidentified Chinese buyer for $150 million. The painting was temporarily lent to Neue Galerie New York for the exhibition “Klimt and the Women of Vienna’s Golden Age, 1900–1918.”

See also
 Portrait of Adele Bloch-Bauer I
List of paintings by Gustav Klimt
Woman in Gold (2015 film)
List of most expensive paintings

References

Notes

External links
 Adele's Wish

1912 paintings
20th-century portraits
Paintings by Gustav Klimt
Portraits by Austrian artists
Arts set in Austria
Jews and Judaism in Vienna
Jews and Judaism in Austria